Belfry Mountain is a mountain in the Adirondack Mountains region of New York. It is located north-northwest of Witherbee in Essex County. The Belfry Mountain Fire Observation Station is located on top of the mountain.

History
The first structure built on the mountain was a wooden tower that was constructed by the Conservation Commission in 1912. In 1917, the Commission replaced it with a  Aermotor LS40 tower. The tower was taken out of service in 1988. The tower was officially closed in early 1989 by the Department of Environmental Conservation.

External links
 The Fire Towers of New York

References

Adirondacks
Tourist attractions in Essex County, New York
Mountains of Essex County, New York
Mountains of New York (state)